Al Staehely is a singer/songwriter from the 1970s. He was featured in Spirit, The Staehely Brothers, The Nick Gravenites / John Cipollina Band and recorded with labels such as Epic and Polydor.

He is now an entertainment lawyer based in Houston, Texas. He has specialized in legal matters pertaining to the music and film industries since 1979.

Music career
After receiving his undergraduate degree from the University of Texas at Austin in 1967 and J.D. from the University of Texas School of Law in 1970, Staehely was admitted to the Texas bar before moving to Los Angeles. In 1971, he replaced John Arliss (who briefly succeeded Mark Andes) as bassist in the already-established Spirit, touring with drummer Ed Cassidy and keyboardist John Locke as a trio while guitarist Randy California convalesced from a horse accident. Shortly thereafter, California departed the group and was replaced by Staehley's brother, John Christian Staehely. Under the aegis of producer David Briggs (best known for his lifelong collaboration with Neil Young), the new quartet recorded Feedback (1972), which showcased the bassist as the band's lead vocalist and principal songwriter.

Two years later, he wrote ten songs for a Staehely Brothers album (Sta-Hay-Lee) also released on Epic Records. Later, Polydor released a solo album by Al Staehely. His songs have been recorded by Keith Moon, Bobbie Gentry, Patti Dahlstrom, Nick Gravenites, John Cipollina, Marty Balin, Peter Cox and Hodges, James & Smith.

In an interview, Staley said, "Law didn't lead me to music. Music delivered me to law. Like so many others, I played in bands while in high school (Austin, Texas), in university (The University of Texas) and in law school (The University of Texas School of Law). Unlike most others, I didn't practice law for almost ten years after graduating. I joined the group Spirit, wrote songs, recorded for Epic records and toured the world."

Entertainment lawyer
His clients include musicians, record labels, music publishing companies, and distribution companies. He handles various matters related to recording, publishing, sub-publishing, and licensing both domestically and internationally.

Staehely has represented film production companies, optioned life-story rights, and cleared music rights for films including the Academy Award-nominated documentary For All Mankind. He also represents clients with respect to litigation in all matters related to the entertainment business, including copyright and trademark issues.

In addition to his practice, Staehely has taught music publishing and music business law at both the Art Institute of Houston and St. Thomas University, also in Houston. He has also served as adjunct professor at the University of Houston Law Center, teaching entertainment law.

Staehely is also a member of The National Academy of Recording Arts and Sciences, the International Association of Entertainment Lawyers, and the entertainment and sports law section of the Texas Bar and the American Bar Association.

Discography

Cadillac Cowboys – Al Staehely & The Explosives, 2013, SteadyBoy Records
Rockpalast: West Coast Legends, Vol. 1 – John Cipollina/Nick Gravenites Band, 2009, Fresh Fruit
Stahaley's Comet – Al Staehely, 1982, Polydor (originally released in Europe; re-released in the U.S. by SteadyBoy Records under the name "Al Staehely & 10K Hrs.")
Monkey Medicine – Nick Gravenites-John Cipollina Band, 1982, Big Beat Records
Sta.Hay.Lee – The Staehely Brothers, 1973, Epic Records
Feedback – Spirit (band), 1972, Epic Records

Songs

Your Man In Rio, 2016, Artist - Al Staehely, Single
Heart of Texas (The Texas Christmas Song), 2013, Artist – Al Staehely featuring Mickey Raphael, Single
Bailout Blues, 2013, Artist – Al Staehely & The Explosives, Album – Cadillac Cowboys
Feel The Heat, 2013, Artist – Peter Cox, Album – Riding the Blinds
Longshot, 1982, Artist – Al Staehely, Album – Stahaley's Comets
The Bluer Side of Town, 1982, Artist – Al Staehely, Album – Stahaley's Comet
Ice on Fire, 1982, Artist – Al Staehely, Album – Stahaley's Comet
Coastin''', 1982, Artist – Al Staehely, Album – Stahaley's CometMr. X-Terminator, 1982, Artist – Al Staehely, Album – Stahaley's CometLovin' Tuff, 1982, Artist – Al Staehely, Album – Stahaley's CometLow Threshold for Pleasure, 1982, Artist – Al Staehely, Album – Stahaley's CometHot Rods and Cool Women, 1982, Artist – The Nick Gravenites, John Cipollina Band, Album – Monkey MedicineSigns of Life, 1982, Artist – The Nick Gravenites John Cipollina Band, Album – Monkey MedicineTrust Me, 1982, Artist – The Nick Gravenites John Cipollina Band, Album – Monkey MedicineMercy of the Moon, 1991, Artist – Marty Balin, Album – Better GenerationLouisiana, 1975, Artist – Patti Dahlstrom, Album – Your Place or MineHe Did Me Wrong, But He Did It Right, 1975, Artist – Patti Dahlstrom, Album – Your Place or MineWithout Love, 1976, Artist – Patti Dahlstrom, Album – Livin' It ThruLookin' for Love, 1976, Artist – Patti Dahlstrom, Album – Livin' It ThruCrazy Like a Fox, 1975, Artist – Keith Moon, Album – Two Sides of the MoonFuture Shock, 1973, Artist – The Staehely Bros., Album – Sta.Hay.LeeWoman in Love, 1973, Artist – The Staehely Bros., Album – Sta.Hay.LeeWoe is Me, 1973, Artist – The Staehely Bros., Album – Sta.Hay.LeeLoco Motive, 1973, Artist – The Staehely Bros., Album – Sta.Hay.LeeSoldiers in the Night, 1973, Artist – The Staehely Bros., Album – Sta.Hay.LeeCaptain Zombie Meets Unfellini, 1973, Artist – The Staehely Bros., Album – Sta.Hay.LeeRockin' in the Bush, 1973, Artist – The Staehely Bros., Album – Sta.Hay.LeeYou Won't Be Sorry, 1973, Artist – The Staehely Bros., Album – Sta.Hay.LeeChelsea Girls, 1971, Artist – Spirit, Album – FeedbackCadillac Cowboys, 1971, Artist – Spirit, Album – FeedbackRipe and Ready, 1971, Artist – Spirit, Album – FeedbackEarth Shaker, 1971, Artist – Spirit, Album – FeedbackMellow Morning, 1971, Artist – Spirit, Album – FeedbackRight on Time, 1971, Artist – Spirit, Album – FeedbackWitch, 1971, Artist – Spirit, Album – FeedbackNew York City'', 1971, Artist – Spirit, Album – Feedback

References

External links 
 Music-lawyer.com
 alstaehely.com

American rock musicians
Songwriters from Texas
American entertainment lawyers
Living people
1945 births
Writers from Austin, Texas
Musicians from Austin, Texas
Spirit (band) members
University of Texas School of Law alumni